Konrad Gołoś (born 15 September 1982 in Siedlce) is a Polish retired footballer.

Career
The first club in Gołoś' senior career was Pogoń Siedlce. He is a midfielder who made his league debut on 7 August 2004 and was an official player of the Wisła Kraków squad from the beginning of the 2005/06 season, having transferred from Polonia Warsaw. Gołoś had previously played for the current Polish II Liga team Radomiak Radom.

On 28 April 2005, he played his first international match for Poland in the draw against Mexico.

Statistics

External links

1982 births
Living people
Polish footballers
Górnik Zabrze players
Polonia Warsaw players
Wisła Kraków players
Poland international footballers
People from Siedlce
Sportspeople from Masovian Voivodeship
Association football midfielders
MKP Pogoń Siedlce players